Matt Plumb (Born 8 July 1974) is a racing driver who has previously competed in the Barber Dodge Pro Series and currently races in the Continental Tire Sports Car Challenge. Matt Plumb is also team manager of Rum Bum Racing, a sportscar and GT racing team.

Career
Matt Plumb was born on 8 July 1974 to Michael Plumb and Donnan Sharp. His father was a former Olympic equestrian rider and United States Olympic Hall of Fame inductee. His mother competed in the 1968 Summer Olympics. After his bachelor study in history and economics at the University of Virginia and a short career in finance at Donaldson, Lufkin & Jenrette Matt pursued a career in auto racing.

Plumb started his racing career in the 1997-98 Skip Barber Formula Dodge Southern Race Series. The driver from Rhode Island won his first race ever at Sebring International Raceway. Plumb dominated the series and won ten races in total. Plumb won the championship over Pete Boss and Giandomenico Brusatin, he was also nominated for the Big Scholarship runoffs. In 1998 Matt Plumb also competed in three Barber Dodge Pro Series races, which was the maximum for a Big Scholarship nominee. Plumb scored two top ten finishes at Homestead-Miami Speedway and Mazda Raceway Laguna Seca. Despite not winning the Big Scholarship Plumb secured a full-time drive in the 1999 Barber Dodge Pro Series season.

Plumb had a tough start in the 1999 season, he only finished in the top ten once in the first five races. However towards the end of the season the young driver grabbed his first professional podium finish. At Homestead-Miami Speedway Plumb came in third, behind Todd Snyder and Jon Fogarty. Plumb significantly improved for the 2000 Barber Dodge Pro Series season. After consistent top ten finishes the driver from Rhode Island won his first Barber Dodge Pro Series race. At Vancouver Plumb won the first ever Barber Dodge Pro Series race not ran in the United States of America. 2001 was his fourth and final year in the Barber Dodge Pro Series. This proved also to be his most successful. After a rough start with two retirements, Plumb won races at Detroit and Laguna Seca. Scoring another four podium finishes Plumb finished third in the standings equal in points to Sepp Koster. As Koster had more wins than Plumb the Dutchman was awarded second place in the standings.

In 2002 Plumb made his debut in the 24 Hours of Daytona. Plumb finished sixteenth overall in his Seikel Motorsport entered Porsche 996 GT3-RS For 2003 Plumb returned to full-time racing. He made his debut in the SPEED Touring Car Championship in a BMW 325. At Lime Rock Park Plumb finished second behind Pierre Kleinubing. Plumb won the SPEED Touring Car Championship Rookie of the Year title. The following season Plumb switched to an Acura TSX and returned in the series. At Mid-Ohio and Mosport Plumb finished first. He eventually finished third in the standings.

For 2005 Plumb joined JMB Racing to race in the Rolex Sports Car Series GT class. Racing the Ferrari 360 Modena was not a success. The team's best result was at the 250 mile race at Homestead-Miami Speedway. The team finished 28th overall, tenth in class. For 2006 Matt joined his brother Hugh Plumb at Bill Fenton Motorsports in the Grand-Am Cup. The combination was a success. The two brothers won races at Barber Motorsports Park and Virginia International Raceway. The duo ended up runners-up in the championship standings and helped Acura win the manufacturers championship. The following years Matt continued to run a partial schedule in the Grand-Am Cup/KONI Challenge Series with reasonable success. In 2009 Plumb joined Rum Bum Racing LLC as a driver and team manager. In their inaugural Continental Tire Sports Car Championship the team finished fifth in the GS class. Plumb continued to be a front runner in the series. In 2011 Plumb won three races and finished third in the championship. In 2012 Plumb and co-driver Nick Longhi won the prestigious championship. The duo won three races and scored an additional four podium finishes.

In 2014 Plumb was voted into the Road Racing Drivers Club.

Complete motorsports results

American Open-Wheel racing results
(key) (Races in bold indicate pole position, races in italics indicate fastest race lap)

Barber Dodge Pro Series

24 Hours of Daytona

Complete WeatherTech SportsCar Championship results
(key) (Races in bold indicate pole position; results in italics indicate fastest lap)

References

Barber Pro Series drivers
1974 births
Sportspeople from Providence, Rhode Island
24 Hours of Daytona drivers
Rolex Sports Car Series drivers
WeatherTech SportsCar Championship drivers
University of Virginia alumni
Living people
GT World Challenge America drivers
Michelin Pilot Challenge drivers